Thug is an upcoming American crime thriller film directed by Hans Petter Moland, written by Tony Gayton, and starring Liam Neeson as a brooding aging gangster.

Cast
Liam Neeson
Ron Perlman
Yolonda Ross
Daniel Diemer
Levon Panek
Ghia Truesdale
Tom Kemp
Bruce Busta Soscia
Ryan Homchick
Josh Drennen
William Xifaras
Javier Molina
Kayla Kohla
Omar Moustafa Ghonim
Kris Eivers

Production
Filming occurred in Winthrop, Massachusetts in October 2022.  Filming also occurred in Allston earlier that same month. Filming also took place in Norwood, Massachusetts in November 2022.

References

External links
 

Upcoming films
American crime thriller films
Films directed by Hans Petter Moland
Films produced by Roger Birnbaum
Films shot in Boston
Films shot in Massachusetts
Upcoming English-language films